The Edward Hotel & Convention Center was a 14-story, 773-room former conference center hotel located in the Metro Detroit suburb of Dearborn, Michigan at 600 Town Center Drive, near the intersection of M-39 and U.S. Highway 12. It was the second largest hotel in Michigan, after the Marriott in Detroit's Renaissance Center.

History
The hotel was constructed in 1976 as the Hyatt Regency Dearborn. Originally built as an upscale hotel, the building included a Ford-designed monorail people mover to Fairlane Mall. The people mover, hotel, and mall were supposed to be part of a larger office, retail, and residential complex built by Ford's land development subsidiary. The people mover was a Ford Motor Company prototype for an Automatically Controlled Transportation System and was closed in 1988, and ultimately removed.

The hotel also originally had a revolving restaurant on its top floor. It also originally featured a helipad. It originally had 800 hotel rooms when it opened.

The high-rise hotel contains a conference center, restaurants, retail area, and fitness center. The architect, Charles Luckman, designed the hotel in a contemporary Modern style with glass as the main exterior material. The hotel was built by the Del E. Webb Corporation. The hotel is adjacent to Fairlane Town Center shopping mall, near Ford World Headquarters, and The Henry Ford Museum and Greenfield Village.

The hotel was renamed Adoba Hotel Dearborn / Detroit on November 1, 2012, then Royal Dearborn Hotel and Convention Center in 2015. Chinese-Canadian businessman Xiao Hua Gong, also known as Edward Gong, bought the hotel for $20 million in 2016 and renamed it after himself, calling it first the Edward Village Michigan Hotel, then the Edward Hotel & Convention Center.

On December 14, 2018, the hotel was deemed "unfit for human occupancy" by the City of Dearborn and condemned and closed due to fire code violations and lack of necessary permits. The hotel was seized from Gong by US and Canadian authorities in 2021, after his business empire imploded as a result of multi-national criminal investigations in the US, Canada and New Zealand. 

On September 18, 2021, the vacant structure was sold by the United States Marshals Service to an unnamed buyer for $27 million. The buyer announced plans to convert the 773-room hotel to 375 apartments, while possibly retaining a small hotel portion.

See also 
Architecture of metropolitan Detroit
Tourism in metropolitan Detroit

Notes

Further reading

External links 
 details at Emporis.com
 Google Maps location
 SkyscraperPage.com's Profile

Skyscrapers in Dearborn, Michigan
Hotel buildings completed in 1976
Buildings and structures with revolving restaurants
1976 establishments in Michigan
Skyscraper hotels in Michigan
Defunct hotels in the United States
Unused buildings in Michigan

Charles Luckman buildings